The information regarding List of rivers in the Arica y Parinacota Region on this page has been compiled from the data supplied by GeoNames. It includes all features named "Rio", "Canal", "Arroyo", "Estero" and those Feature Code is associated with a stream of water. This list contains 34 water streams.

Content
This list contains:
 Name of the stream, in Spanish language
 Coordinates are latitude and longitude of the feature in ± decimal degrees, at the mouth of the stream
 Link to a map including the Geonameid (a number which uniquely identifies a Geoname feature)
 Feature Code explained in 
 Other names for the same feature, if any
 Basin countries additional to Chile, if any

List

 Rio UchusumaRío Uchusuma3926636STMI(PE, BL)
 Rio ChisllumaRío Chislluma3894959STMI
 Rio AzufreRío Azufre3899050STMI

  Río CaracaraniRío Caracarani3896809STMI(Quebrada Caracarani, Quebrada Caracharani, Rio Caracarani, Río Caracarani)
  Rio CaquenaRío Caquena3896817STM
  Rio CondorireRío Condorire3893800STM
  Río GuailasRío Guailas3888601STMI(Quebrada Guailas, Rio Guaylas)
  Rio CosapillaRío Cosapilla3893395STMI(BL)
  Rio AncomaRío Ancoma3899704STM
  Rio JuraseRío Jurase3886670STM
  Rio BlancoRío Blanco3898219STM
 Rio LaucaRío Lauca3883639STM(Rio Lauca, Río Lauca)(BO)
  Rio ChusjavidaRío Chusjavida3894666STM
  Rio PaquisaRío Paquisa3877232STM
  Rio VizcachaniRío Vizcachani3868019STM
  Río ChalloaniRío Challoani3895598STM
  Rio LlutaRío Lluta3882827STM(Rio Lluta, Río Lluta)
  Rio SecoRío Seco3871050STMI
  Río Blanco3898239STMI(Arroyo Blanco, Estero Blanco, Rio Blanco, Río Blanco)
  Rio San JoseRío San José3872085STMI
  Canal Lauca3883641CNLI (from Rio Lauca)
  Rio TignamarRío Tignamar3869863STMI(Quebrada de Tianamar, Rio Tignamar, Río Tignamar)
  Rio QuiburcancaRío Quiburcanca3874302STMI
  Rio GuaiguasiRío Guaiguasi3888605STM
  Estero Veco3868554STMI
  Rio BlancoRío Blanco3898191STMI
  Río JanureRío Janure3886972STMI(Arroyo Janure, Estero Janure, Rio Janure, Río Janure)
  Estero Utalacata3868750STMI
  Rio SurireRío Surire3870427STM
  Rio JarumaRío Jaruma3886934STMI(Rio Jarama, Rio Jaruma, Río Jarama, Río Jaruma)
  Rio PailcoailloRío Pailcoaillo3877756STMI
  Rio TaruguireRío Taruguire3870100STM
  Rio BlancoRío Blanco3898190STMI
  Rio ChuquianantaRío Chuquiananta3894690STMI(Arroyo Chuquiananta, Estero Chuquiananta, Rio Chuquiananta, Río Chuquiananta)
  Río Camarones3897158STM(Camarones Gully, Quebrada Camarones, Quebrada de Camarones, Rio Camarones, Río Camarones)
  Rio AjatamaRío Ajatama3900322STMI
  Rio MacusaRío Macusa3881062STM
  Rio CaritayaRío Caritaya3896647STMI
  Rio BlancoRío Blanco3898218STM

See also
 List of lakes in Chile
 List of volcanoes in Chile
 List of islands of Chile
 List of fjords, channels, sounds and straits of Chile
 List of lighthouses in Chile

Notes

References

External links
 Rivers of Chile
 Base de Datos Hidrográfica de Chile
 

Parinacota